Rookie  was an American online magazine for teenagers created by fashion blogger Tavi Gevinson. Rookie published art and writing from a wide variety of contributors, including journalists, celebrities, and the magazine's readers.  The subject matter ranged from pop culture and fashion to adolescent social issues and feminism. Rookie's content was divided into monthly "issues", each built around a theme.  It updated five days a week, three times a day: roughly just after school, at dinnertime, and "when it’s really late and you should be writing a paper but are Facebook stalking instead."

History
In November 2010, Gevinson announced on her blog, Style Rookie, that she would be launching a new magazine with Jane Pratt, founding editor of Sassy. Though Sassy had ceased publication in 1996, the year Gevinson was born, the fashion blogger had on several previous occasions expressed her admiration for the defunct indie teen magazine and lamented the fact that her generation did not have a Sassy heir to call its own.

Negotiations began between Pratt, Gevinson, and Say Media, the internet publisher behind Pratt's women's lifestyle site xoJane. This American Life host Ira Glass acted as a consultant to Gevinson and her manager and father, Steve, during the negotiations. Eventually, Pratt withdrew from official involvement in the venture, enabling Gevinson to maintain ownership. Pratt remains credited on the Rookie contributors' page as the magazine's "fairy godmother".

Rookie launched in September 2011, with Gevinson serving as editor-in-chief, former New York Times Magazine fact-checker Anaheed Alani serving as editorial director and story editor. On November 30, 2018, it was announced through a goodbye editor's note published by Gevinson on the site that after a seven-year run, that the website would shut down and cease publication immediately.

Reception
Rookie has received much attention from the blogosphere and traditional news outlets. Kara Jesella, former Teen Vogue editor and co-author of How Sassy Changed My Life: A Love Letter to the Greatest Teen Magazine of All Time, praised Rookie for its "easy" and "unapologetic" marriage of fashion and feminism. Eva Wiseman of The Observer described Gevinson as "one of the sanest, most articulate voices in the media today" and wrote, "The world worries for teenage girls today. All the porny influences, the sexting, the surgery – all the saturated pink. But counteracting these pressures to conform are the voices like those on Rookie, ones that are non-prescriptive, enthusiastic, embarrassing, funny. Ones that, by unpicking the awkwardness of female adolescence and providing a place to talk about it, have helped feminism become almost fashionable." A number of Rookies features—such as "Ask a Grown Man/Ask a Grown Woman," in which adult celebrities answer questions submitted by teen readers—also received popular attention.

References

External links 
 The Rookie website
 Gevinson discusses the motivation for Rookie in a TEDxTeen lecture: "Still figuring it out" (March 2012)

Online magazines published in the United States
Teen magazines
Magazines established in 2011
Magazines disestablished in 2018
Defunct magazines published in the United States